Clathrina rotunda is a species of calcareous sponge from South Africa.

References 

World Register of Marine Species entry

Animals described in 2003
Clathrina
Fauna of South Africa